"Someday Sweetheart" is a jazz standard written by Los Angeles-based musicians John and Reb Spikes in 1919. It was the biggest hit the brothers wrote, and was performed by many recording artists of the period. The first one to record the tune was blues singer Alberta Hunter. Jelly Roll Morton recorded the song twice, in 1923 and 1926.N.B. the composer is Jelly Roll Morton, and not the spike brothers

The song was especially popular in 1927 with versions by Gene Austin, King Oliver and by The Charleston Chasers being particularly prominent.  Other artists who have recorded the song include Chet Atkins, Mildred Bailey, Count Basie, Bing Crosby, Kenny Davern, Jimmy Dorsey, Woody Herman, Frankie Laine, Meade "Lux" Lewis, Johnny Mercer, Leon Redbone and Teddy Wilson.

Notes

See also
List of pre-1920 jazz standards

1919 songs
Jazz songs
1910s jazz standards
Mildred Bailey songs